Ancalomicrobium adetum is a bacterium from the order of Hyphomicrobiales and the only species in the genus Ancalomicrobium. It was isolated from freshwater creek.

References

External links
Type strain of Ancalomicrobium adetum at BacDive -  the Bacterial Diversity Metadatabase

Hyphomicrobiales
Bacteria described in 1968